Craig A. Miller and Eric Sherbeck were the defending champions, but lost in the quarterfinals this year.

Broderick Dyke and Wally Masur won the title, defeating Peter Doohan and Brian Levine 4–6, 7–5, 6–1 in the final.

Seeds

  John Alexander /  John Fitzgerald (first round)
  Broderick Dyke /  Wally Masur (champions)
  Peter Doohan /  Brian Levine (final)
  David Graham /  Laurie Warder (semifinals)

Draw

Draw

References
Draw

Next Generation Adelaide International
1984 Grand Prix (tennis)
1984 in Australian tennis